The former St. Patrick's Catholic Church is a historic Roman Catholic parish church located at 1301-1305 West Market Street in Louisville, Kentucky, United States. The church built in 1860 is a large 3-story steepled redbrick Romanesque Revival building, while the rectory next door is a 2-story redbrick structure. In 1991 the Roman Catholic Archdiocese of Louisville leased the building for 25 years to Dismas House Charities to be use as a rehabilitation center known as "Dismas House".On March 17, 2004, over 600 attended a  the 150th celebration. The original 1854 Church and school which was situated behind the church on 13th Street were torn down without a demolition permit in June 2004 by its owner, Cardinal Insulation, shortly before the time the Xaviarian Brothers would celebrate their 150th anniversary. Despite all three structures being added  March 1, 1982, to the National Register of Historic Places former parishioners were in shock and vowed to seek local Louisville Landmark status for the 1862 Church and rectory. A complete history of the church was written by Doris Batliner and published to secure the needed funds to pay for the designation. On March 17, 2006, the church became a local Louisville landmark.

Plans are underway to return the 1854 Church cornerstone to the site of its former location March 17, 2014 for the church's 160th anniversary.

References

External links
 Dismas Facilities: St. Patrick

Roman Catholic churches completed in 1853
19th-century Roman Catholic church buildings in the United States
Roman Catholic churches in Louisville, Kentucky
Local landmarks in Louisville, Kentucky
National Register of Historic Places in Louisville, Kentucky
Churches on the National Register of Historic Places in Kentucky
U.S. Route 31
1853 establishments in Kentucky
Romanesque Revival architecture in Kentucky
Clergy houses
Roman Catholic Archdiocese of Louisville